Ostrova is a rural locality (a village) in Posyolok Urshelsky, Gus-Khrustalny District, Vladimir Oblast, Russia. The population was 19 as of 2010.

Geography 
Ostrova is located 18 km northwest of Gus-Khrustalny (the district's administrative centre) by road. Novy is the nearest rural locality.

References 

Rural localities in Gus-Khrustalny District